Nevenka: Breaking the Silence is a 2021 Spanish docuseries starring Jolene Andersen and Don Baldaramos.

Cast
 Jolene Andersen
 Don Baldaramos

Episodes

Release
Nevenka: Breaking the Silence was released on March 5, 2021, on Netflix.

References

External links
 
 

2021 Spanish television series debuts
2021 Spanish television series endings
2020s Spanish drama television series
Documentary television series about crime
Spanish documentary television series
Spanish-language Netflix original programming
Netflix original documentary television series
Works about sexual harassment